Seventh Avenue Depot District is a national historic district located at Hendersonville, Henderson County, North Carolina.  The district encompasses 27 contributing buildings and 1 contributing structure in Hendersonville. The district consists of the frame early 20th century depot, a block of original brick street pavement beside it, twenty-seven stores and warehouses, a hotel, and two houses. Notable buildings include the Queen Anne style J.W. Bailey House (c. 1898), Station Hotel (1912–1922), and American Craftsman style Hendersonville Southern Railway Depot (1902-1904).

It was listed on the National Register of Historic Places in 1989.

References

Historic districts on the National Register of Historic Places in North Carolina
Queen Anne architecture in North Carolina
Houses completed in 1898
Buildings and structures in Henderson County, North Carolina
National Register of Historic Places in Henderson County, North Carolina
Hendersonville, North Carolina